Navika Kotia is an Indian actress who appears in Hindi films and television. She is popularly known for her work as adult Chikki in Yeh Rishta Kya Kehlata Hai on Star Plus. And she has also acted in an Indian film English Vinglish as Sridevi's daughter with her brother Shivansh Kotia. She is now seen in Yeh Rishta Kya Kehlata Hai once again in a new role as  Maya Khera.

Personal Life
She has lost a lot of weight recently and is very consistent with her health and fitness.

Filmography

Films

Television

Music Videos

See also 

 Pranali Rathod
 Shivansh Kotia
 Palak Sindhwani
 Anushka Sen
 Ashnoor kaur

References

External links
 
 

Living people
Indian television child actresses
Indian film actresses
21st-century Indian child actresses
Year of birth missing (living people)